A mimic function changes a file  so it assumes the statistical properties of another file . It is commonly considered to be one of the basic techniques for hiding information, often called steganography. 

The simplest mimic functions use simple statistical models to pick the symbols in the output.

Even more sophisticated models use reversible Turing machines.

References
 
 
 

Steganography